Robert Lewis Cobb (born October 12, 1957) is a former American football defensive end in the National Football League. Cobb was selected in the third round (66th overall pick) by the Los Angeles Rams out of the University of Arizona in the 1981 NFL Draft. Scouting reports praised his size (6-4, 248 pounds) and speed (4.8 in 40-yard dash). He played for the Rams (1981), the Tampa Bay Buccaneers (1982), and the Minnesota Vikings (1984).

References

1957 births
Players of American football from Cincinnati
American football defensive ends
Northeast Mississippi Tigers football players
Cincinnati Bearcats football players
Arizona Wildcats football players
Los Angeles Rams players
Tampa Bay Buccaneers players
Minnesota Vikings players
Living people